Emil Safarov (born on 30 October 2002) is an Azerbaijani professional footballer who plays as a winger for Gabala in the Azerbaijan Premier League.

Career

Club
On 21 August 2021, Safarov made his debut in the Azerbaijan Premier League for Gabala match against Keşla.

References

External links
 

2002 births
Living people
Association football forwards
Azerbaijani footballers
Azerbaijan under-21 international footballers
Azerbaijan youth international footballers
Azerbaijan Premier League players
Gabala FC players